Jay Bradley Johnson (born April 20, 1977) is an American baseball coach and former second baseman, who is the current head baseball coach of the LSU Tigers. He played college baseball at Shasta from 1997 to 1998 before transferring to Point Loma Nazarene. He then served as the head coach of the Point Loma Nazarene Sea Lions (2005), Nevada (2014–2015) and the Arizona Wildcats (2016–2021).

Education
Born and raised in Oroville, California, Johnson graduated from Oroville High School in 1995 and began his college baseball career at Shasta College, a junior college in Redding, California, in 1997. After two years at Shasta, Johnson transferred to Point Loma Nazarene in the 1998–99 school year to complete his college career.  A second baseman and starter in the 1999 and 2000 seasons, he hit .326 for the Sea Lions as a senior.

Coaching career
While completing his bachelor's degree in physical education, Johnson became an assistant coach at Point Loma Nazarene in 2001 and remained an assistant coach after graduating before being promoted to head coach for the 2005 season. Johnson led the Sea Lions to a #6 national ranking in the NAIA and a division championship.

On August 23, 2005, Johnson became an assistant coach at the University of San Diego. The Toreros won three West Coast Conference championships and made four appearances in the NCAA Division I Baseball Championship with Johnson on staff.

On June 28, 2013, Nevada announced that Johnson would take over as head coach.

In two seasons at Nevada, Johnson guided the Wolf Pack to a 72–42 record. In 2015, Nevada posted a 41–15 record and captured the school's first-ever Mountain West title with a 22–7 mark in league play. The Wolf Pack was ranked in the top 25 for much of the season and totaled a 13–1 record in series of at least three games. The 41 overall wins ranked second in program history. In 2015 Johnson was named Mountain West Coach of the Year.

In 2016 Johnson guided the wildcats to a seventh appearance in the College World Series where they ended up falling to Coastal Carolina in the championship series.

On June 24, 2021, Johnson left Arizona to become the head coach of the LSU Tigers.

Head coaching record
Below is a table of Johnson's yearly records as an NCAA head baseball coach.

See also
List of current NCAA Division I baseball coaches

References

1977 births
Living people
Baseball second basemen
Shasta Knights baseball players
Nevada Wolf Pack baseball coaches
Sportspeople from Oroville, California
Point Loma Nazarene Sea Lions baseball coaches
Point Loma Nazarene Sea Lions baseball players
San Diego Toreros baseball coaches
Baseball coaches from Nevada
Baseball coaches from California
Arizona Wildcats baseball coaches
LSU Tigers baseball coaches